Sukumar Brahma is a scientist in the field of electrical engineering, and a Fellow of the Institute of Electrical and Electronics Engineers (IEEE). He has been named as a fellow member for his contributions to power system protection with distributed and renewable generation.

Education
Sukumar received the B.E. degree from Gujarat University in 1989, the M.Tech. degree from The Indian Institute of Technology Bombay, Mumbai, India in 1997, and the Ph.D. degree from Clemson University, Clemson, SC, USA, in 2003.

Career
He is currently a Dominion Energy Distinguished Professor in power engineering and the Director of Clemson University Electric Power Research Association, Clemson University.

See also
Johan H. Enslin
Mohammad Shahidehpour

References

Indian electrical engineers
Fellow Members of the IEEE
Clemson University faculty
Clemson University alumni
Year of birth missing (living people)
Living people